The Conwy County Borough is on the north coast of Wales, and has a heavily populated coastal strip. A third of the county is within the Snowdonia National Park. There are a total of 161 scheduled monuments in the county. 106 of these are Prehistoric, including at least six neolithic sites. Like much of Wales, there are large numbers of Bronze Age sites, particularly burial mounds, and some 40 Iron Age sites including hillforts and hut groups. There are just three Roman sites, and six early medieval (Pre-Norman Conquest), all of which are early Christian monuments, including inscribed stones and a holy well. From the post-Norman medieval period, the castle and walls of Conwy itself are part of a World Heritage Site. There are numerous other fortified sites, along with lost villages, ruined chapels and a Bishop's palace amongst the 24 medieval sites. In the post-medieval period, there are two sites, including churches, bridges, lead mines and World War II defences. Conwy is made up of parts of the historic counties of Denbighshire and Caernarvonshire, which are covered respectively by the Clwyd-Powys Archaeological Trust (CPAT) and Gwyneth Archaeological Trust.

Scheduled monuments have statutory protection. It is illegal to disturb the ground surface or any standing remains. The compilation of the list of sites is undertaken by Cadw Welsh Historic Monuments, which is an executive agency of the National Assembly of Wales. The list of scheduled monuments below is supplied by Cadw with additional material from RCAHMW and Clwyd-Powys and Gwynedd Archaeological Trusts.

Scheduled monuments in Conwy

.

See also
List of Cadw properties
List of castles in Wales
List of hill forts in Wales
Historic houses in Wales
List of monastic houses in Wales
List of museums in Wales
List of Roman villas in Wales

References
Coflein is the online database of RCAHMW: Royal Commission on the Ancient and Historical Monuments of Wales, CPAT is the Clwyd-Powys Archaeological Trust, GAT is the Gwyneth Archaeological Trust, Cadw is the Welsh Historic Monuments Agency.

Conwy
Buildings and structures in Conwy County Borough